Sidsel Ekholdt  (born 10 March 1956) is a retired Norwegian artistic gymnast.

She was born in Øvre Eiker. She competed at the 1972 Summer Olympics.

References

External links 
 

1956 births
Living people
People from Øvre Eiker
Norwegian female artistic gymnasts
Olympic gymnasts of Norway
Gymnasts at the 1972 Summer Olympics
Sportspeople from Viken (county)
20th-century Norwegian women